Rhopalosciadium is a genus of flowering plants belonging to the family Apiaceae.

Its native range is Iran.

Species:
 Rhopalosciadium stereocalyx Rech.f.

References

Apiaceae
Apiaceae genera